Oliver Wade Hall-Craggs (born 9 January 1966) is a British rower and Olympic sculler. He is the former head coach at Durham University Boat Club, a position he held between 2000 -2021, in this time he mainly coached the heavy-weight men. He represented Great Britain in the single scull event at the 1992 Summer Olympics. He is now coaching at St Peter's College Adelaide, Australia's leading school rowing program, and the winners of the Barrington Cup in 2021

Hall-Craggs read Archaeology at Grey College, Durham (1985-1988).

References

External links 
 
 

1966 births
Living people
English male rowers
British male rowers
Rowers at the 1992 Summer Olympics
Durham University Boat Club rowers
Alumni of Grey College, Durham
Olympic rowers of Great Britain